Huanggutun station can refer to:
Huanggutun railway station, a railway station closed in 2018.
Huanggutunzhan station, a metro station under construction on Line 9 of Shenyang Metro.